The Free Workers' Union of Germany (FAUD) was an anarcho-syndicalist trade union in Germany.  It stemmed from the Free Association of German Trade Unions (FDVG) which combined with the Ruhr region's Freie Arbeiter Union on September 15, 1919. 

The FAUD was involved in the revolution in Germany from 1918 to 1923, and continued to be involved in the German labor movement after the FAUD began to decline in 1923.  After 1921, the FAUD added an "AS" to their name, signifying a full transition from simple syndicalism to anarcho-syndicalism.  This also led to further difficulties between the intellectual elites of the FAUD (AS), such as Rudolf Rocker, and the rank and file workers, mostly in the Ruhr region, who were more worried about "bread and butter" issues than anarchist political activities.  These workers, the majority of the FAUD-(AS) members, formed the Gelsenkircherichtung (Gelsenkirche tendency) within the movement, and given the movements federalist structure, began to drift away from the FAUD-(AS) intellectually and organizationally.  Eventually, those workers who had joined during the revolution left the movement and the remaining FAUD-(AS) members came from the FDVG's original constituencies of the building trades and specialized textile workers.

The Nazis suppressed the FAUD in January 1933 after coming to power.  However, many of its members continued to do political work illegally and organized resistance against the Nazi regime, both in Germany and elsewhere (see: Gruppe DAS and the revolution in Spain, 1936–1939). The International Workers' Association, of which the FAUD was a member, was founded upon the initiative of the German organization in 1922. The Free Workers' Union (FAU), which was founded in 1977, considers itself a successor of the FAUD. At its peak, the FAUD had 150,000 members.  The primary organ of the FAUD was the newspaper Der Syndikalist, which was first published in December 1918, and continued until the group's suppression by the Nazis.

See also
 List of trade unions
 Union of Manual and Intellectual Workers

References

Bibliography

External links
Institute for Syndicalism Research
Free Workers' Union of Germany/ Freie Arbeiter Union Deutschlands texts from the Kate Sharpley Library

1918 establishments in Germany
1933 disestablishments in Germany
Anarchist organisations in Germany
Anarcho-syndicalism
Defunct trade unions of Germany
International Workers' Association
National trade union centers of Germany
Organizations of the German Revolution of 1918–1919
Trade unions established in 1919
Trade unions disestablished in 1933
Syndicalist trade unions